Akkelpur railway station is a railway station in Akkelpur, Joypurhat District, Rajshahi Division, Bangladesh.

See also
 Joypurhat District
 Joypurhat railway station
 Bangladesh Railway
 Santahar railway station
 Kamalapur railway station

References

Railway stations in Joypurhat District